Stéphane Rossi (born 23 March 1964) is a French football manager and a former player who manages  club Cholet. He played as a midfielder or forward.

Coaching career
On 4 November 2021, Rossi was hired by Championnat National club Bastia-Borgo.

On 27 May 2022, Rossi was signed by Cholet.

References

1964 births
Living people
French footballers
Association football midfielders
Association football forwards
CA Bastia players
French football managers
Ligue 2 managers
Championnat National managers
SC Bastia managers
Sportspeople from Bastia
Footballers from Corsica